Setti is a surname. Notable people with the surname include:

Camillo Setti, Italian Baroque painter
Duilio Setti (born 1912), Italian footballer
Emanuela Setti Carraro (1950–1982), Italian nurse
Ercole Setti, Italian Renaissance engraver
Giulio Setti (1869–1938), Italian choral conductor
Kilza Setti (born 1932), Brazilian ethnomusicologist, composer and pianist
Maurizio Setti (born 1963), Italian businessman
Sebastián Setti (born 1984), Argentine footballer

See also
Riccardo Levi-Setti (born 1927), Italian physicist and paleontologist

Italian-language surnames